Garkalne is a village in Ādaži Municipality in the historical region of Vidzeme, and the Riga Planning Region in Latvia.

References

Ādaži Municipality
Towns and villages in Latvia